Jeffrey Carroll (born November 6, 1994) is an American professional basketball player for Helsinki Seagulls in the Finnish Korisliiga. He played college basketball for the Oklahoma State Cowboys.

College career
Carroll averaged 8.2 points and 4.0 rebounds per game as a sophomore at Oklahoma State. As a junior, Carroll was named to the Second-team All-Big 12. He averaged 17.5 points and 6.6 rebounds per game. Carroll missed the first three games of his senior season as the program was under review. As a senior, Carroll was named to the Third-team All-Big 12. He averaged 15.4 points, 6.2 rebounds and 1.8 assists per game.

Professional career
After going undrafted in the 2018 NBA draft, he joined the Los Angeles Lakers for the 2018 NBA Summer League, averaging 4.2 points and 2.0 rebounds per game. On July 19, 2018, Carroll signed with the Lakers. On October 8, 2018, Carroll was waived by the Lakers. He subsequently signed with the Lakers' G League affiliate, the South Bay Lakers.

During the 2019–20 season he played in the Italian second tier national league, the Serie A2 Basket for Bergamo Basket, averaging 17.9 points and 6.2 rebounds per game. On May 22, 2020, Carroll signed with Universo Treviso Basket in the top tier LBA Italian league.

In June 2020, it was revealed that Carroll was a victim of former assistant coach Lamont Evans, who was sentenced to three months in prison on bribery charges. This was related to Carroll's three-game suspension in college.

At the beginning of 2021, before the end of the 2020–21 LBA season, Carroll moves from Treviso back to the Serie A2 signing for Pallacanestro Biella. After a brief stint with Pallacanestro Forlì, at the end of December, 2021 he would sign a contract with Eurobasket Roma.

In August of 2022, Carroll signed a contract with the Helsinki Seagulls.

The Basketball Tournament
Carroll joined Stillwater Stars, composed of Oklahoma State alumni, in The Basketball Tournament 2020.

References

External links
Oklahoma State Cowboys bio

1994 births
Living people
American expatriate basketball people in Italy
American men's basketball players
Basketball players from Texas
Lega Basket Serie A players
Oklahoma State Cowboys basketball players
People from Rowlett, Texas
Small forwards
South Bay Lakers players
Sportspeople from the Dallas–Fort Worth metroplex
Universo Treviso Basket players